1998 World Ice Hockey Championships may refer to:
 1998 Men's World Ice Hockey Championships
 1998 World Junior Ice Hockey Championships